Ringside is a 1949 American film noir drama sport film directed by Frank McDonald for Lippert Pictures from a story by Daniel B. Ullman, adapted by Ron Ormond.

Plot
Don Barry plays a pianist who turns to boxing to avenge his brother.

Cast
 Don 'Red' Barry as Mike O'Hara / King Cobra (as Don Barry)
 Tom Brown as Joe O'Hara
 Sheila Ryan as Janet' J.L.' Branningan
 Margia Dean as Joy White
 John Cason as Tiger Johnson
 Joseph Crehan as Oscar Brannigan 
 Lyle Talbot as Radio Announcer
 William Edmunds as Prof. Berger
 Harry Brown as Fight Manager
 Chester Clute as Timid Man
 Michael Vallon as Battor (as Mike Vallon)
 Edit Angold as Mama Berger
 Jimmy Martin Fight Second (as Jimmie Martin)
 Sam Flint as Doctor
 Frankie Van as Referee
 Don Tobey as Fight Announcer
 Joey Adams as Duke Hensel
 Tony Canzoneri as Swinger Markham 
 Mark Platt as Gangster

References

External links
Ringside at IMDb
Ringside at BFI
Ringside at Letterbox DVD

1949 films
1940s sports films
American boxing films
1940s English-language films
Films directed by Frank McDonald
American black-and-white films
Lippert Pictures films
1940s American films